I Cry When I Laugh is the debut studio album by English singer Jess Glynne. It was released on 21 August 2015 in the United Kingdom and 11 September 2015 in the United States by Atlantic Records and Warner Music Group. I Cry When I Laugh was recorded over three years, with Glynne working with several record producers on it. 

Upon release, the album received mixed reviews from music critics, but had a positive commercial performance, with it peaking at number one in the United Kingdom, and reaching the top ten in Australia, the Netherlands, Ireland, and Italy. In the United States, the album peaked at number 25 on the Billboard 200, where it spent 12 weeks on the chart.

The album was preceded by the UK top-ten singles "Right Here" and "Real Love", as well as the UK number-one singles "Hold My Hand" and "Don't Be So Hard on Yourself". The album's fifth single, "Take Me Home", was released on 3 November 2015 as the official BBC Children in Need single of 2015. The deluxe edition also includes the collaborative singles "Rather Be" (with Clean Bandit), "My Love" (with Route 94) and "Not Letting Go" (with Tinie Tempah), all of which reached number one in the UK. The album was also promoted with the Ain't Got Far to Go Tour, lasting from September to November 2015 with concerts taking place in both North America and the United Kingdom.

Background
In August 2013, the singer signed a contract with Atlantic Records, consequently leaving her job at the time in brand management for a drinks company. The same year, deep house producer Route 94 approached Glynne about rewriting and providing vocals for a song of his, called "My Love", which at the time contained a sample that he was prohibited from using. It was released on DJ Annie Mac's compilation album Annie Mac Presents in October 2013 and led to Glynne’s discovery by British electronic group Clean Bandit who approached her to feature on their song "Rather Be". Released as a single in January 2014, "Rather Be" debuted at number one on the UK Singles Chart, becoming the third fastest-selling single and the most streamed song of 2014. The track attained number-one and top-five positions on charts across Europe and Oceania, and was a top ten hit on the US Billboard Hot 100. In February 2014, Route 94's "My Love" was released as a single; it also debuted at number one in the UK.  Prior to writing the songs for the album, Glynne had broken up with her girlfriend.

Critical reception

I Cry When I Laugh received mixed reviews from music critics. On Metacritic, which assigns a rated mean out of 100 from mainstream critics, it currently holds a score of 53, based on six reviews, indicating "mixed or average reviews". The Independent writer Andy Gill found that Glynne's "recent chart-topper "Hold My Hand" provides a fairly accurate template for her debut album, as regards both methods and themes. It’s a record of heartbreak cauterised by hope, so alongside the routine tears and recrimination is a recurrent element of recovery and optimism that sets it apart from most other soul-diva offerings." John Aizlewood from Evening Standard wrote that "it’s a relentless listen, probably best served in single exhilarating portions rather than as a whole, but the kitchen sink production on "Don’t Be So Hard on Yourself" is a windswept delight and bold is always more fun than mealy-mouthed". Digital Spy called I Cry When I Laugh a "mix of emotions, blending heartbroken lyrics with uplifting melodies. The overall formula isn't particularly forward-thinking, neither is it pushing the fringes of pop, but somehow it comes across as strikingly distinct I Cry When I Laugh is [...] an accomplished and uplifting debut album."

Paul MacInnes from The Guardian rated the album two out of five stars and wrote that "Glynne is now being launched in her own right, with this lengthy collection intended to showcase her talents. It’s unclear quite what those are, however – not so much because Glynne lacks a distinctive voice, but more because the variety of producers and arrangements here mean it’s difficult to tell quite what her thing is." Similarly, musicOMH's Andy Baber felt that "I Cry When I Laugh never really manages to become more than just a collection of singles. Admittedly, the singles are all of the highest quality [...] but there is no getting away from the fact that the album as a whole is rather underwhelming. It is great as something to dip in and out of, but I Cry When I Laugh is proof that Glynne is far from the finished article." Hazel Cills, writing for Spin magazine, added that while "you’ve probably heard Glynne’s voice before you even knew who the English singer was, you might not know who she is even after hearing her debut record." She felt that the album was plagued by "scatterbrained production", "neck-deep clichés", and "relentless self-help tracks, all of which begin to blend together."

Despite the mixed reception, I Cry When I Laugh was named the 16th and 10th best pop album of 2015 by Rolling Stone and Entertainment Weekly, respectively. The New York Observer placed the album at number 5 in their list of best debut albums of 2015.

Commercial performance
I Cry When I Laugh debuted at number one on the UK Albums Chart with combined sales of just under 60,000, giving Glynne the second fastest-selling debut album of 2015 behind James Bay's Chaos and the Calm. The album has reached the top 10 in the Republic of Ireland, Australia, Italy and the Netherlands. It has also peaked at number 25 on the US Billboard 200.

The album had been certified Platinum by the British Phonographic Industry (BPI) for sales of over 300,000 copies and sold 583,000 copies in the UK during 2015. It has since been certified 4× Platinum for sales of over 1,200,000 copies. The album also received the gold certification by RIAA for sales over 500,000 copies in the United States.

Singles

Selected as the first single from I Cry When I Laugh, "Right Here" was released on 6 July 2014. It received a positive from critics who called it "a little more low-key" than Glynne's previous collaborations on Clean Bandit's "Rather Be" and Route 94's "My Love", both of which had reached the top of the UK Singles Chart in early 2014. The song peaked at number six on the UK Singles Chart and reached the top ten in Belgium and Scotland. It was eventually certified silver by the British Phonographic Industry (BPI). "Real Love", another collaboration with Clean Bandit, was released as the second single on 16 November 2014. It reached number two on the UK Singles Chart and peaked at number two on the German Singles Chart.

"Hold My Hand" was released as the album's third single on 22 March 2015. The song debuted at number one in the United Kingdom, where it became Glynne's first solo number one. While it charted within the top twenty on most charts in appeared on, "Hold My Hand" also peaked at the top position in Belgium and Scotland. "Don't Be So Hard on Yourself" was released as the fourth single to precede I Cry When I Laugh. Released on 14 August 2015, it gave Glynne her fifth number-one single following the number-one success of her Tinie Tempah collaboration "Not Letting Go", making her the second British female solo artist to do this after Cheryl Cole, overtaking then current record sharers Geri Halliwell and Rita Ora. A music video for "Take Me Home", the album's sixth single, was released on 30 October 2015 on Glynne's official Facebook page. The song is also the official BBC Children in Need 2015 single. "Ain't Got Far to Go" was released as the album's sixth single on 4 January 2016.

Other songs
"Rather Be" was released on 17 January 2014 as a single from Clean Bandit's debut album, New Eyes. The song reached number one on the UK Singles Chart and was the second best-selling song of 2014.
"My Love" is Route 94's debut single. It was released on 28 February 2014 and reached number one on the UK Singles Chart. "My Love" (Acoustic) was made available to download on 27 May 2015.
"Not Letting Go" was released on 19 June 2015 as the first single from Tinie Tempah's third studio album, Youth. The single debuted at number one on the UK Singles Chart, becoming Glynne's fourth number one.
"Why Me" was made available to download on 31 July 2015.

Promotion

Tour
Glynne went on her Ain't Got Far to Go Tour across the United States and United Kingdom which started on 14 September 2015 and ended on 11 November 2015.

Live performances
On 23 May 2015, Glynne performed at Radio 1's Big Weekend 2015, where she sang "Ain't Got Far to Go", "Right Here", "Real Love", "Gave Me Something", "My Love", "Rather Be", "Don't Be So Hard on Yourself", "Not Letting Go" with Tinie Tempah and "Hold My Hand".

On 28 May 2016 she performed at Radio 1's Big Weekend 2016. She played "Don't Be So Hard on Yourself", "Rather Be", "Ain't Got Far to Go", "My Love", "Take Me Home", "Right Here" and "Hold My Hand".

She also performed at Glastonbury in 2016 where she sang "Don't Be So Hard on Yourself", "Rather Be", "No Rights No Wrongs", "Gave Me Something", "Not Letting Go", "My Love", "Ain't Got Far to Go", "Love Me", "Right Here", "Why Me", "Take Me Home", "You Can Find Me", "I Feel For You" and "Hold My Hand".

Track listing

Notes
  signifies a co-producer
  signifies an additional producer
  signifies an original producer
 The deluxe edition is repackaged into a Digipak

Charts

Weekly charts

Year-end charts

Decade-end charts

Certifications

Release history

References

External links
 JessGlynne.co.uk — official site

2015 debut albums
Jess Glynne albums
Albums produced by Steve Mac
Atlantic Records albums
Albums produced by TMS (production team)